Sychesia dryas is a moth in the family Erebidae. It was described by Pieter Cramer in 1775. It is found on the West Indies, Guatemala, Costa Rica, French Guiana, Brazil, Peru, Ecuador, Bolivia, Suriname, Venezuela and Trinidad.

Subspecies
Sychesia dryas dryas
Sychesia dryas tupus Jordan, 1916

References

Moths described in 1775
Phaegopterina
Taxa named by Pieter Cramer